is a manga written and illustrated by Tetsuya Chiba. It ran in Weekly Shonen Magazine for nearly eight years and received an anime adaptation in 1977. The series received the Kodansha Cultural Children's Award (not to be confused with the Kodansha Manga Award) in 1976.

Plot
Teppei Uesugi and his father have long since lived deep in the forest in search of buried treasure. Since he has not been a member of cultured society for a long time, Teppei is wild and unmannered. One day, Teppei's uncle finds him and Teppei finds out that he is actually from a very prestigious family and had five siblings. For the first time in his life, he will have to attend school and live under his grandmother's rules. Can Teppei really adapt to his new environment?

Characters 
 Masako Nozawa as Teppei Uesugi
 Akiko Tsuboi as Azumi Uesugi
 Masao Imanishi as Hiromi Uesugi
 Tohru Furuya as Yoshiyuki
 Makoto Kōsaka as Kanako
 Shozo Iizuka as Yoshioka
 Youko Matsuoka as Onigiri

References

External links
 

Anime series
Anime series based on manga
Fuji TV original programming
Kendo in anime and manga
Kodansha manga
Nippon Animation
Shōnen manga